Wankaner is a city and a municipality in Morbi district in the State of Gujarat. Until 2013, Wankaner was part of the Rajkot district.

Etymology
The city was named after its location on the Machhu River, "Wankaner" translating to "riverbend" ("Wanka" - bend, " -ner" - river) in Gujarati.

Geography

History
Wankaner was legendarily founded by four friends, and two were saints i.e. Shahbava and Nagabava. Nagabava was the Rajyguru of state. Shahbava in an event cursed the state, that the place would fall due to either fire or water. The temple of Nagabava and dargah of Shahbava survive in the old city, and thousands of people go for worship each day to get blessings. Wankaner has many other Hindu and Muslim places of worship.

Wankaner State was an 11-gun salute state during the British Raj era, when it was governed by members of the senior branch of the Jhala rajput 
dynasty.

References

Cities and towns in Morbi district
Former capital cities in India